Brian H. Kemball-Cook (December 12, 1912 – September 19, 2002) was a classicist and headmaster at a direct grant grammar school in Blackburn and Bedford Modern School. Among other works, Kemball-Cook published his translation of Homer's Odyssey into English in the original meter (1993).

See also 
 English translations of Homer: Brian Kemball-Cook

References

External links 
 CalliopePress.co.uk

Alumni of Balliol College, Oxford
English classical scholars
Heads of schools in England
1912 births
2002 deaths
Translators of Homer